East Berlin Historic District is a national historic district located at East Berlin in Adams County, Pennsylvania. The district includes 177 contributing buildings in the central business district and surrounding residential areas of East Berlin. They primarily date from the third quarter of the 18th to the early-20th century. It includes a notable collection of 18th century log and stone dwellings.  Notable buildings include 426 W. King Street (c. 1780), 414 W. King Street, 412 W. King Street (1790), 400 W. King Street (1897), 210 W. King Street (c. 1860), 200–202 W. King Street, 110 W. King Street, 105–107 W. King Street, 127 W. King Street, 529 W. King Street, 115–117 E. King Street, 119–121 E. King Street, 104 Fourth Street (East Berlin Jaycees Hall), and Church School House.

It was listed on the National Register of Historic Places in 1985.

See also
 Swigart's Mill

References 

Historic districts on the National Register of Historic Places in Pennsylvania
Georgian architecture in Pennsylvania
Federal architecture in Pennsylvania
Historic districts in Adams County, Pennsylvania
National Register of Historic Places in Adams County, Pennsylvania